Cyathostemon verrucosus is a member of the family Myrtaceae endemic to Western Australia.

It is found in an area of the Goldfields-Esperance region of Western Australia between Kalgoorlie and Southern Cross.

References

verrucosus
Plants described in 2014
Taxa named by Malcolm Eric Trudgen
Taxa named by Barbara Lynette Rye